Gerisheh-ye Sofla (also Romanized as Gerīsheh-ye Soflá; also known as Gerūsheh-ye Soflá) is a village in Dasht-e Hor Rural District, in the Central District of Salas-e Babajani County, Kermanshah Province, Iran. At the 2006 census, its population was 49, in 11 families.

References 

Populated places in Salas-e Babajani County